Tong is a Chinese surname.  Tong as transcribed in English however represents of a number of different Chinese surnames.

There were 8,589 Tongs in the United States during the year 2000 census, making it the 3,075th surname overall and the 121st surname among Asian and Pacific Islanders.

Tong was also listed among the 200-most-common Chinese surnames in a 2010 survey of the Registered Persons Database of Canadian health card recipients in the province of Ontario. Tong may be the romanisation of the very common surname Zhang (張), as well as others such as Deng (鄧), Zhuang (莊), Teng (滕), and a number of Tongs (童, 同 and 佟).

Origin of some common Tongs (張, 莊, 滕, 鄧)

Tong is a Gan romanization of the Chinese surnames Zhang (trad. , simp. ) and Zhuang (trad. , simp. ).

Tong is also the Cantonese romanization of the Chinese surname Tang (唐).

同 the Tong

During the Shang Dynasty period, Lord Zi (子)  founded the state of Tong (同国) in Shaanxi of China, later the Zi (子) family used the surname Tong (同, Tóng). The Tong surname may also have originated as a surname given to public officers during the middle Zhou Dynasty.

Some Tong families are said to be descendants of Sima Qian.  Sima Qian was a Han Dynasty historian who wrote the Records of the Grand Historian. According to this story, when Sima Qian was put in prison by the Emperor, his children fled. His two sons decided to change their name, each using one character of the Sima surname (司马).  The Si (司) was modified to Tong (同) by the addition of a stroke, while Ma (馬) was modified to Feng (馮).  There remains a taboo that the two families should not intermarry.

佟 the Tong

Pronounced Tong (Tóng) in Mandarin Chinese, but Tung in Cantonese

Tong family originated from 
Jie of the last Xia Dynasty period.
Jin (真) people the Chinese Minority.
Various Chinese Minority Group on Any Dynasty period.
Jurchen people (女眞) of early Qing Dynasty period. 
Xibe people (锡伯) the Chinese Minority in Liaoning.
Donghu people the Mongolian after Han Dynasty period.
the Sinicization of the Manchu clan name/surname Tunggiya

童 the Tong

Tong family originated from
Lao Tong (老童), the son of Zhuanxu, one of mythical Five Emperors
Xu Tong (胥童) of Eastern Zhou and the Spring and Autumn period
Futong (夫童), a city in the Spring and Autumn period
Tongshi （童使）, the name of male servants before Qin dynasty to Song dynasty
Descendants of Dong Zhuo (董卓), who changed their surname to avoid prosecution
Mongol people of Qing dynasty
Hui people originated in Xiyu (西域)
Other ethnic minorities who adopted the Han Chinese surname

See  仝 for Second-round simplified Chinese character

See also

Tona (name)
Tono (name)
 Zhang (surname), for more about that surname in mainland China and on Taiwan
 Zhuang (surname), for more about that surname in mainland China and on Taiwan

References

Chinese-language surnames
Multiple Chinese surnames